Antti Reini (born 27 August 1964) is a Finnish film actor. At the 27th Guldbagge Awards he was nominated for the award for Best Actor for his role in Il Capitano: A Swedish Requiem.

Seven films (2011–2015) made from the Vares novels by Reijo Mäki feature Antti Reini; the first six of these (2011–2012) have been released on DVD in Region 1.

Selected filmography

Cinema 
 Il Capitano: A Swedish Requiem (1991)
 As White as in Snow (2001)
 The Man Without a Past (2002)
 Helmiä ja sikoja (2003)
 Solstorm (2007)
 Everlasting Moments (2008)
 Stone's War (2008)
 The House of Branching Love (2009)
 Angel (2009)
 Beyond the Border (2011)
 The Kiss of Evil (2011)
 The Girls of April (2011)
 Garter Snake (2011)
 The Path of the Righteous Men (2012)
 Vares: Gambling Chip (2012)
 Vares: Tango of Darkness (2012)
 Vares: The Sheriff (2015)
 Devil's Bride (2016)

TV 
 Sincerely Yours in Cold Blood (29 episodes, 2000–2005)
 Tusenbröder (2003)
 Tatort – Tango für Borowski (2010 – Crime Scene, German crime television series)

References

External links

1964 births
Living people
Male actors from Helsinki
Finnish male film actors
21st-century Finnish male actors
Finnish male television actors
20th-century Finnish male actors